Perfectly Good Guitar is singer-songwriter John Hiatt's eleventh album, released in 1993.  It was his last studio album with A&M Records, despite it being Hiatt's highest charting album in the US (#47), Canada (#34), the UK (#67), the Netherlands (#13), and Sweden (#11). The European edition of the album contains the bonus track "I'll Never Get Over You." Iggy Pop first issued the song "Something Wild" on his 1990 album Brick By Brick.

Track listing
All tracks written by John Hiatt except where noted.
"Something Wild" – 4:31
"Straight outta Time" – 4:30
"Perfectly Good Guitar" – 4:38
"Buffalo River Home" – 5:11
"Angel" – 3:18
"Blue Telescope" – 4:21
"Cross My Fingers" – 4:02
"Old Habits" – 4:42 (Hiatt, Marshall Chapman)
"The Wreck of the Barbie Ferrari" – 4:35
"When You Hold Me Tight" – 5:23
"Permanent Hurt" – 3:22
"Loving a Hurricane" – 3:58

Charts

Personnel
John Hiatt – Guitar, vocals, Piano, Organ
Brian MacLeod – drums, percussion
John Pierce – Bass guitar
Dennis Locorriere – Harmony vocals
Michael Ward – Guitar
Ravi Oli – Electric sitar [Ravi Oli is a pseudonym of David Immerglück]

References

1993 albums
John Hiatt albums
Albums produced by Matt Wallace
A&M Records albums